List of journals may refer to:
 Lists of academic journals
 List of scientific journals
 List of literary magazines
 Lists of newspapers

See also 
 List of diarists
 Journal (disambiguation)